Edith Ayrton Zangwill (1879 – 5 May 1945) was a British author and activist. She helped form the Jewish League for Woman Suffrage.

Early life
Ayrton was born in 1875 in Japan to the scientist William Edward Ayrton and the doctor Matilda Chaplin Ayrton. Her mother died in 1883 and her father married the physicist Hertha Ayrton. Ayrton was brought up in the Jewish faith.

Writing 
In 1904 she wrote her first novel, Barbarous Babe. Her other books include: The First Mrs. Millivar (1905); Teresa (1909); The Rise of a Star (1918); The Call (1924); The House (1928); and The Story of Disarmament Declaration (1932).

Activism 
Edith complained of poor health and did not feel that she could be a militant suffragette but she and her stepmother joined the Women's Social and Political Union. Edith wrote to Maud Arncliffe Sennett to tell her that she intended to support the WSPU generously. Her husband spoke publicly in support of the WSPU and was hissed by liberally minded women for his support of militant tactics.

Jewish League for Woman Suffrage 
In 1912 she helped form the Jewish League for Woman Suffrage which was open to both male and female members. The organization sought both political and religious rights for women. It was felt that some Jewish people may be more inclined to join this group in preference to an unspecific women's suffrage group. Other members included her husband, Henrietta Franklin, Hugh Franklin, Lily Montagu, Inez Bensusan and Leonard Benjamin Franklin. Some more radical parts of the organization were responsible for disrupting synagogue services to make their point in 1913 and 1914. The group was labeled as "blackguards in bonnets" by the wider Jewish community.

United Suffragists 
The Jewish suffrage supporters came together on 6 February 1914 with other disillusioned suffragists to create the United Suffragists. The new group was created as a reaction to the extreme militancy of the WSPU which had started a campaign of arson and the lack of success of the National Union of Women's Suffrage Societies. The new group included her stepmother, her husband, Emmeline Pethick-Lawrence, Maud Arncliffe Sennett, Agnes Harben and her husband and Louisa Garrett Anderson. It welcomed former militants as well as non-militants and men as well as women. Once the Representation of the Peoples Act 1918 passed allowing (some) women to vote, the United Suffragists disbanded.

Personal life and death 
She married Israel Zangwill in a registry office on 26 November 1903. They had met as a result of her stepmother sending Edith's early stories to published writer Israel for his comments.

They had three children: George (born 1906), Margaret (born 1910) and Oliver Louis Zangwill (born 1913). Ayrton lived for many years in East Preston, West Sussex, in a house called Far End. She was widowed in 1926 and died in Edinburgh in 1945, the year of her 66th birthday.

Works
 Barbarous Babe (1904)
 The First Mrs Mollivar (1905)
 Teresa (1909)
 The Rise of a Star (1918)
 The Call (1924), which is similar to her stepmother's life
 The House (1928)
 The Story of the Disarmament Declaration (1932)

References

1879 births
1945 deaths
20th-century British women writers
British suffragists
Place of birth missing
British Jewish writers
Edith
People from East Preston, West Sussex
Jewish suffragists
Jewish women writers
Jewish women activists